Will Traynor (born February 24, 1989, in St. Charles, Missouri) is an American soccer player.

Career

College and amateur
Traynor attended Francis Howell North High School, played in the Region II Olympic Development Program and Missouri state teams, and played club soccer for the Scott Gallagher club, before going on to play four years of college soccer at the University of South Carolina.

He earned Second Team ESPN The Magazine Academic All-District III accolades as a sophomore in 2008, won the team's Bill Lauritzen Memorial Award and the Coaches' Award, was named to the Conference USA All-Academic Team as a junior in 2009, and was named to the All-Conference USA First-Team, the ESPN Academic All-District III First Team, the ESPN Academic All-American Third-Team, the C-USA All-Academic Team, the Conference USA All-Tournament Team and the NSCAA All-South Third Team following his senior year in 2010. He finished his collegiate career with 10 goals and two assists in 76 games for the Gamecocks.

Professional
Undrafted out of college, Traynor signed his first professional contract on February 22, 2011, when he signed with USL Professional Division club Rochester Rhinos. He made his professional debut on May 27, 2011, in a 1–1 tie with the Wilmington Hammerheads.

Personal
Will's brother, Jack Traynor, is also a professional soccer player. Will is married to his college sweet heart, All-American for University of South Carolina’s Women’s Soccer, Brittiny Rhoades.

References

External links
Rochester Rhinos profile
South Carolina Gamecocks bio

American soccer players
USL Championship players
Rochester New York FC players
South Carolina Gamecocks men's soccer players
1989 births
Living people
Soccer players from Missouri
Association football defenders